Ayoleyi Hanniel Solomon (born 6 December 1993), better known by his stage name Reekado Banks, is a Nigerian singer and songwriter. He signed with Mavin Records in 2014 and left the label in 2018. He went by the stage name Spicy before his record deal with Mavin Records. Reekado Banks won Rookie of the Year at The Headies 2014, and won the controversial Next Rated award at The Headies 2015. His debut studio album Spotlight was released on 1 September 2016; it debuted at number 10 on the Billboard World Albums chart.

Life and career
Reekado Banks is the last child of a music-loving family. His father is a pastor from Ondo State and his mother is a caterer. He grew up in a disciplinarian setting due to both of his parents being pastors. He completed his secondary school at the age of 14, and started recording his first set of songs in 2008. His elder brother produced all of his earlier songs and tutored him on the rudiments of singing, writing and producing. He derived the stage name Reekado Banks by combining the meanings of the two names; the former part of his stage name translates to "strong ruler", while the latter part loosely translates to "wealth". In 2014, Reekado Banks graduated from the University of Lagos with a degree in history and strategic study. He has cited Don Jazzy, 2face Idibia, DJ Jimmy Jatt, Olamide and M.I as his key musical inspirations.

Mavin Records deal and artistry
His record deal with Mavin Records came as a result of his brother submitting some of his songs to the label in an online talent search. Reekado Banks got signed to Mavin Records after his entries were selected from over 5000 entries. In an interview with the National Mirror, he said his brother submitted his songs and communicated with the label on his behalf without his initial consent. Reekado Banks also told the National Mirror that he is a versatile artist who makes music with the thought that humans are different and have different taste.

2014–present: Singles and Mavin Records departure
Reekado Banks premiered the single "Turn It Up" on 21 February 2014, which coincided with the day he signed with Mavin Records. The song features Tiwa Savage and was released as his first official single under Mavin Records. Reekado Banks was featured on the critically  acclaimed song "Dorobucci", alongside Don Jazzy, Korede Bello, Tiwa Savage, Di'Ja, Dr SID and D'Prince. Reekado Banks also worked with some of the aforementioned artists to release three collaborative singles: "Adaobi", "Arise" and "Looku Looku". On 13 February 2015, he released the Don Jazzy-produced single "Katapot". It was alleged to be a diss track towards D'banj and Wande Coal. In February 2015, Don Jazzy debunked the allegations in a series of tweets. While speaking to Vanguard Newspaper, Reekado Banks said he created "Katapot" for his fans.

In July 2015, Reekado Banks signed an endorsement deal with Nigerian telecommunications company Globacom. On 7 December 2018, he announced his departure from Mavins Records after five years at the label. He also announced the launch of his independent outfit, Banks Music. In September 2019, Vanguard newspaper reported that Reekabo Banks dropped his elder brother, Temi Solomon, as his manager. In 2021, he released the single "Ozumba Mbadiwe".

Discography

Studio albums
Spotlight (2016)

EPs
 Off the Record (2020)
OTR, Vol. 2 (2021)
Ozumba Mbadiwe Remix (2022)

Selected singles

References

External links

1993 births
Living people
Musicians from Lagos
Nigerian male singer-songwriters
University of Lagos alumni
Nigerian hip hop singers
The Headies winners
English-language singers from Nigeria
Yoruba-language singers
21st-century Nigerian male singers